331P/Gibbs (P/2012 F5) is a small periodic Encke-type and rare main-belt comet, discovered by American amateur astronomer Alex Gibbs.

Description 

It is a rare type of comet called a main-belt comet. Although most comets come from the Oort cloud or the Kuiper belt, main-belt comets are instead members of the asteroid belt that have a coma and tail. As of 2016, it is one of only 15 known main-belt comets.

Precovery observations of 331P/Gibbs in Sloan Digital Sky Survey data were found dating to August 2004, in which the object was visible as a regular asteroid. Further observations in 2014 by the Keck Observatory showed that the comet was fractured into 5 pieces and rotating rapidly, with a rotation period of only 3.2 hours. Due to the YORP effect, P/2012 F5 had begun to spin so quickly that, being a likely rubble pile, parts began to be thrown off, leaving a very long dust trail. This is very similar to 311P/PANSTARRS, being the best-established cause for main-belt comets along with impacts between small asteroids (such as with 596 Scheila and P/2010 A2 (LINEAR)).

References

External links
331P in SDSS (26 August 2004)
331P confirmation observations, Malina River Observatory (23 March 2012)

Active asteroids
Encke-type comets
0331
Discoveries by Alex R. Gibbs
20120322